GO Transit is the inter-regional transportation authority of the Golden Horseshoe, which includes the Greater Toronto and Hamilton Area.  It is Canada's oldest regional transit system, first serving passengers in 1967.

Fare zones 
The service area of GO Transit is divided into a number of fare zones, each of which belonging to a number of fare corridors.  Fares on GO Transit are based on the distance between originating and destination fare zones.  Tickets between two fare zones are valid for travel between the two fare zones stated on the ticket, as well as between any two fare zones that lie between them on the same fare corridor.  Tickets are not generally issued between two fare zones on different corridors, with the following notable exceptions:

 Due to all-day GO train service and the interlining of the Lakeshore West line and the Lakeshore East line, tickets may be issued for trips starting in a fare zone on one line and ending in a fare zone on the other.  Similarly, due to the number of GO bus connections between stations on the Lakeshore West line and the Milton line (including Square One Bus Terminal, but excluding Lisgar GO station), tickets may be issued for trips starting in a fare zone in Mississauga or Milton outside of the Lakeshore West line and fare zones on either of the Lakeshore lines.
 Tickets are generally issued for trips between a fare zone inside Toronto and a fare zone outside the City of Toronto, even if they lie in different fare corridors; such tickets are valid between the fare zone outside the City of Toronto to any fare zone inside the City of Toronto for which the ticket value is equal or less.  (For example, a ticket from Square One Bus Terminal to Scarborough Centre Bus Terminal would also be valid for trips to Kennedy GO Station, as the trips are of equal value, even though all three locations are on different fare corridors.)  Note that Milliken GO Station, despite physically located within the City of Toronto, is considered to be in a fare zone outside of the City of Toronto for historical reasons.

As all GO Transit tickets are only valid for continuous trips of no more than two and a half hours, multiple tickets may be needed for longer trips.

List of fare zones 
Fare zones 1–9, 19, 59, 70, 77, 79, 89 and 90 (shaded in green) are located within Toronto.

Fare classes 
GO Transit offers three passenger fare classes: adult, senior and student.  Senior fares are available for passengers over the age of 65. As of March 9, 2019, passengers under the age of 12 can ride free on all GO Transit trains and buses.

Student fares are only available for those with acceptable student identification:
 For high school students, school-issued student identification is needed.  Note that these do not necessarily need to be identification issued by a school within GO Transit's service area.
 Full-time students of post-secondary institutions anywhere in Canada (not necessarily within GO Transit's service area) for which student identification is reissued each year may use their school-issued student identification for proof of student fare qualification.
 Students at Durham College, University of Ontario Institute of Technology, and Trent University's Oshawa Campus require their school-issued student identification for proof of student fare qualification.
 Students at Centennial College, Humber College, Michener Institute, Mohawk College, Niagara University, Sheridan College, and Trent University's Peterborough campus require a sticker to be affixed to their school-issued student identification for proof of student fare qualification.
 Students at McMaster University holding a Hamilton Street Railway U-Pass require their school-issued student identification for proof of student fare qualification.
 All other post-secondary students require the GO Transit student ID.  It is valid for full-time students from October of one year to October of the next year, as long as the student retains full-time status.  GO Transit student ID application forms may be obtained from the registrar's office of their institutions.  These must be processed at GO Transit's offices at Union Station before they may be used as proof of student fare qualification.  Students at Seneca College, Toronto Metropolitan University, York University, University of Waterloo, and the University of Guelph may also obtain GO Transit student identification online, while students at the University of Toronto's St. George, Mississauga, and Scarborough campuses may obtain their GO Transit student identification on campus.

Fare types 
Up until July 31, 2012, GO Transit offered five types of fares:
 Single-ride tickets are for one single journey between two fare zones.  These expire four hours after purchase, and are not refundable.
 Two-ride tickets are for two single journeys between two fare zones.  These do not expire, but are not refundable.
 Day passes are for unlimited journeys between two fare zones from 3AM one day to 3AM the next.  These are not refundable.
 Ten-ride tickets are for 10 single journeys between two fare zones.  These do not expire, and unused portions may be refunded 30 days after purchase.
 Monthly passes are for unlimited journeys between two fare zones for one calendar month.  They are available for purchase 10 days before the month to 14 days into the month, and must be signed by its user for it to be valid.  These may be refundable.

GO Transit stopped selling two-ride and ten-ride tickets on June 1, 2012 and stopped accepting two-ride and ten-ride tickets on July 31, 2012, in favour of using Presto Cards exclusively; paper monthly passes have been discontinued since 1 January 2013; day passes remain available for purchase.  Passengers may convert any unused rides on their tickets to equivalent value on a Presto Card before the end of 2012.

There is no distinction between bus and train service.

Fares between two fare zones for a particular type of ticket and passenger category are based on multiples of the standard (adult single-ride) fare as follows:

Fares are rounded to the nearest $0.05 for single-ride fares and day passes and $1.00 for monthly passes, after fare multiples are applied.  The minimum adult single-ride fare (for travel on GO Transit within one fare zone) is always $4.50; other fares depend on the fare zones travelled.

Presto cards and contactless credit cards 

Presto cards and contactless credit cards are accepted on GO Transit.  Passengers must tap their cards against the reader upon embarking and disembarking the train or bus.  Upon embarking, the minimum fare ($5.30) is always deducted from Presto cards, with fare adjustments performed as the passenger disembarks. With credit cards, charges are processed at the end of the day as a single charge combining all the day's trips.

The following credit cards are accepted: VISA, MasterCard and American Express.

Failure to tap the card upon disembarking ("missed tap-off") will cause the maximum fare to be deducted, under the assumption that the passenger travelled to the point furthest away from the origin point. (For example, passengers failing to tap off when boarding at Union Station will be assessed the fare travelling from Union Station to Kitchener GO Station, the point furthest away on any GO train route serving Union Station.) Passengers regularly travel by GO train may also set a "default trip" between two GO train stations, allowing them to avoid tapping their cards upon disembarking; passengers doing so will have the appropriate fare deducted upon embarking at either endpoint. The default trip is not available on contactless credit cards.

Adult and student passengers using the Presto card receive a further fare discount, depending on the number of trips that have been made per month between two fare zones.

If there are rides between different sets of fare zones, the discounts after the 30th trip (students) and 35th trip (adults) will be based on the total value of rides taken so far; the fare discounts are structured so that adult and student passengers pay less over the course of a month compared to paying for a paper monthly pass ahead of time; the discrepancy is to encourage passengers to adopt the Presto card over the paper monthly pass.

Fare integration 
GO Transit offers fare integration services with local transit providers, as well as with Via Rail.

Via Rail integration 
Via Rail offers interline tickets with GO Transit, where passengers may travel on GO Transit trains and connect with Via Rail trains at any GO station also offering Via Rail services (Aldershot GO Station, Brampton GO Station, Georgetown GO Station, Guelph Central GO Station, Guildwood GO Station, Kitchener GO Station, Niagara Falls railway station (Ontario), Oakville GO Station, Oshawa GO Station, St. Catharines railway station, and Union Station) or vice versa on one ticket; the Via Rail ticket acts as a GO transit proof of payment on the GO transit leg.  Via Rail interline tickets are not valid for GO buses when trains are not running.

Via Rail also offered the GO-Via Pak, which allowed holders of GO Transit monthly passes or 10-ride tickets (between applicable fare zones) to ride between Union Station and five GO Stations (Aldershot, Brampton, Georgetown, Oakville, Oshawa) on Via Rail trains which stopped at those stations.  The GO-Via Pak was priced at the difference between 10 adult single fares and the equivalent 10 adult economy fares on Via Rail.  The GO-Via Pak could not be used with the Presto Card.  The GO-VIA Pak was no longer sold after December 15, 2012 and was not accepted as of January 1, 2013.

Local transit integration 
Fare integration services may exist between GO Transit and local transit providers, where customers may ride GO buses within local service areas using appropriate local proof-of-payment (tickets and/or passes) at no additional cost; GO Transit will also issue a transfer for further travel on local transit providers upon request.  Passengers paying by cash or travelling outside the local service area must pay GO transit fares.  Passengers using Presto Card will be assessed GO transit fares, although plans are in place for local fares to be assessed instead of GO transit fares whenever they are lower.

Durham Region Transit – Though in the past, all GO bus routes serving Durham Region were integrated with DRT, since the launch of DRT Pulse only the routes not covered by DRT Pulse are integrated.  This includes Route 71, 81, 88, 90, and 91, the latter two only between Newcastle and Downtown Oshawa.
York Region Transit (YRT) – No routes currently are integrated with YRT, though GO Transit had operated routes both on behalf of YRT and as a complement to YRT service in the past, before its eventual replacement with YRT routes.  The last such route to have been integrated was Route 69 Sutton, which was replaced by YRT Route 50 Queensville.

GO Transit co-fares 

As of March 14, 2022 most local transit systems - except Toronto Transit Commission and UP Express - that connect with GO Transit offer free admission so long as the customer swipes their Presto card on the connecting vehicle.  In some cases (where applicable), passengers may also present their GO Transit proof-of-payment (a day pass or single-ride ticket) to the local transit operator.

Passengers using the Presto card or contactless credit card (where accepted) will automatically be assessed the co-fare where appropriate, depending on the status of the local transit operator's integration with the Presto Card or contactless credit card.  If the local transit operator does not currently accept the Presto Card or contactless credit card, the co-fare is not applicable with these payment methods.

 Co-Fare monthly passes are issued by the local transit agency, and allows for unlimited co-fare rides in a calendar month.  Passengers not connecting to GO Transit services must pay the full local transit fare.  Currently, co-fares are not counted towards any local transit agency's Presto card loyalty programs.

References

External links 
 GO Transit Fare Info
 GO Transit Ticket Types
 GO Transit Presto Card integration
 GO Transit Fare Calculator

GO Transit